A Sanitarium Scramble is a 1916 American short comedy film produced by the American Film Manufacturing Company, released by Mutual Film and directed by  B. Reeves Eason.

Cast
 Sylvia Ashton
 Hugh Bennett
 Vivian Rich
 Gayne Whitman (as Alfred Vosburgh)

External links

1916 films
1916 comedy films
1916 short films
American silent short films
American black-and-white films
Silent American comedy films
American Film Company films
American comedy short films
Films directed by B. Reeves Eason
1910s American films
1910s English-language films
English-language comedy films